Bree Walters (born 13 February 1976) is an Australian actress, best known for her role as Pippa Todd in Always Greener. She was born and raised in Sydney, New South Wales, Australia.

References

External links
 

Australian television actresses
1976 births
Living people
Actresses from Sydney
21st-century Australian actresses